The 2020–21 South Carolina State Bulldogs basketball team represented South Carolina State University in the 2020–21 NCAA Division I men's basketball season. The Bulldogs, led by eighth-year head coach Murray Garvin, played their home games at SHM Memorial Center in Orangeburg, South Carolina as members of the Mid-Eastern Athletic Conference. With the creation of divisions to cut down on travel due to the COVID-19 pandemic, they played in the Southern Division.

Previous season
The Bulldogs finished the 2019–20 season 11–18, 6–10 in MEAC play to finish in eighth place. They lost in the first round of the MEAC tournament to Howard.

Roster

Schedule and results 

|-
!colspan=12 style=| Non-conference regular season

|-
!colspan=9 style=| MEAC regular season

Sources

References

South Carolina State Bulldogs basketball seasons
South Carolina State Bulldogs
South Carolina State Bulldogs basketball
South Carolina State Bulldogs basketball